The Barnaul constituency (No.39) is a Russian legislative constituency in the Altai Krai. Until 2007 the constituency covered the entirety of Barnaul, however, since 2016 the constituency covers only part of Barnaul, combined with large rural southern Altai Krai, which dilutes potential protest vote in the administrative centre.

Members elected

Election results

1993

|-
! colspan=2 style="background-color:#E9E9E9;text-align:left;vertical-align:top;" |Candidate
! style="background-color:#E9E9E9;text-align:left;vertical-align:top;" |Party
! style="background-color:#E9E9E9;text-align:right;" |Votes
! style="background-color:#E9E9E9;text-align:right;" |%
|-
|style="background-color:#E9E26E"|
|align=left|Aleksey Sarychev
|align=left|Russian Democratic Reform Movement
|
|16.26%

|- Protiv vsex -35,56%
| colspan="5" style="background-color:#E9E9E9;"|
|- style="font-weight:bold"
| colspan="3" style="text-align:left;" | Total
| 
| 100%
|-
| colspan="5" style="background-color:#E9E9E9;"|
|- style="font-weight:bold"
| colspan="4" |Source:
|
|}

1995

|-
! colspan=2 style="background-color:#E9E9E9;text-align:left;vertical-align:top;" |Candidate
! style="background-color:#E9E9E9;text-align:left;vertical-align:top;" |Party
! style="background-color:#E9E9E9;text-align:right;" |Votes
! style="background-color:#E9E9E9;text-align:right;" |%
|-
|style="background-color:"|
|align=left|Nina Danilova
|align=left|Communist Party
|
|31.33%
|-
|style="background-color:"|
|align=left|Aleksandr Lazarev
|align=left|Our Home – Russia
|
|18.55%
|-
|style="background-color:"|
|align=left|Aleksey Sarychev (incumbent)
|align=left|Independent
|
|9.79%
|-
|style="background-color:"|
|align=left|Pytr Akelkin
|align=left|Independent
|
|7.64%
|-
|style="background-color:"|
|align=left|Yury Shmakov
|align=left|Liberal Democratic Party
|
|6.84%
|-
|style="background-color:#A8A821"|
|align=left|Mikhail Yevdokimov
|align=left|Stable Russia
|
|3.37%
|-
|style="background-color:"|
|align=left|Igor Rodionov
|align=left|Independent
|
|2.55%
|-
|style="background-color:"|
|align=left|Galina Timoshenko
|align=left|Yabloko
|
|2.09%
|-
|style="background-color:#FE4801"|
|align=left|Lyudmila Strigina
|align=left|Pamfilova–Gurov–Lysenko
|
|1.74%
|-
|style="background-color:"|
|align=left|Vasily Tolstykh
|align=left|Independent
|
|1.07%
|-
|style="background-color:"|
|align=left|Sergey Potapov
|align=left|Independent
|
|0.48%
|-
|style="background-color:"|
|align=left|Nikolay Makeyev
|align=left|Independent
|
|0.46%
|-
|style="background-color:"|
|align=left|Viktor Stepanov
|align=left|Education — Future of Russia
|
|1.40%
|-
|style="background-color:"|
|align=left|Yury Bogdanov
|align=left|Independent
|
|1.27%
|-
|style="background-color:"|
|align=left|Igor Marchenko
|align=left|Independent
|
|0.84%
|-
|style="background-color:#000000"|
|colspan=2 |against all
|
|5.95%
|-
| colspan="5" style="background-color:#E9E9E9;"|
|- style="font-weight:bold"
| colspan="3" style="text-align:left;" | Total
| 
| 100%
|-
| colspan="5" style="background-color:#E9E9E9;"|
|- style="font-weight:bold"
| colspan="4" |Source:
|
|}

1999

|-
! colspan=2 style="background-color:#E9E9E9;text-align:left;vertical-align:top;" |Candidate
! style="background-color:#E9E9E9;text-align:left;vertical-align:top;" |Party
! style="background-color:#E9E9E9;text-align:right;" |Votes
! style="background-color:#E9E9E9;text-align:right;" |%
|-
|style="background-color:"|
|align=left|Vladimir Ryzhkov
|align=left|Our Home – Russia
|
|53.58%
|-
|style="background-color:"|
|align=left|Nina Danilova (incumbent)
|align=left|Communist Party
|
|26.79%
|-
|style="background-color:"|
|align=left|Lev Korshunov
|align=left|Independent
|
|7.57%
|-
|style="background-color:#1042A5"|
|align=left|Aleksey Sarychev
|align=left|Union of Right Forces
|
|4.66%
|-
|style="background-color:"|
|align=left|Gennady Stroitelev
|align=left|Independent
|
|3.84%
|-
|style="background-color:"|
|align=left|Konstantin Veprov
|align=left|Independent
|
|1.96%
|-
|style="background-color:"|
|align=left|Valery Zyryanov
|align=left|Independent
|
|1.37%
|-
|style="background-color:"|
|align=left|Vladimir Barsukov
|align=left|Liberal Democratic Party
|
|1.33%
|-
|style="background-color:"|
|align=left|Anatoly Korchagin
|align=left|Independent
|
|1.05%
|-
|style="background-color:"|
|align=left|Igor Zimin
|align=left|Independent
|
|0.98%
|-
|style="background-color:#000000"|
|colspan=2 |against all
|
|5.53%
|-
| colspan="5" style="background-color:#E9E9E9;"|
|- style="font-weight:bold"
| colspan="3" style="text-align:left;" | Total
| 
| 100%
|-
| colspan="5" style="background-color:#E9E9E9;"|
|- style="font-weight:bold"
| colspan="4" |Source:
|
|}

2003

|-
! colspan=2 style="background-color:#E9E9E9;text-align:left;vertical-align:top;" |Candidate
! style="background-color:#E9E9E9;text-align:left;vertical-align:top;" |Party
! style="background-color:#E9E9E9;text-align:right;" |Votes
! style="background-color:#E9E9E9;text-align:right;" |%
|-
|style="background-color:"|
|align=left|Vladimir Ryzhkov (incumbent)
|align=left|Independent
|
|35.10%
|-
|style="background-color:"|
|align=left|Aleksandr Ovsiyevsky
|align=left|Communist Party
|
|15.07%
|-
|style="background-color:"|
|align=left|Irina Solntseva
|align=left|United Russia
|
|13.56%
|-
|style="background-color:#00A1FF"|
|align=left|Yekaterina Abramova
|align=left|Party of Russia's Rebirth-Russian Party of Life
|
|12.61%
|-
|style="background-color:"|
|align=left|Dmitry Chikalov
|align=left|Independent
|
|2.97%
|-
|style="background-color:"|
|align=left|Aleksandr Goncharenko
|align=left|Yabloko
|
|2.80%
|-
|style="background-color:"|
|align=left|Vladimir Barsukov
|align=left|Liberal Democratic Party
|
|2.48%
|-
|style="background-color:"|
|align=left|Viktor Torshin
|align=left|Independent
|
|1.82%
|-
|style="background-color:"|
|align=left|Vladimir Kirillov
|align=left|The Greens
|
|1.27%
|-
|style="background-color:"|
|align=left|Sergey Kovalev
|align=left|Industrial Party (Prompartiya)
|
|0.47%
|-
|style="background-color:"|
|align=left|Sergey Mamayev
|align=left|Social Democratic Party
|
|0.45%
|-
|style="background-color:#164C8C"|
|align=left|Yevgeny Semenikhin
|align=left|United Russian Party Rus'
|
|0.43%
|-
|style="background-color:"|
|align=left|Valery Andryushchenko
|align=left|Independent
|
|0.27%
|-
|style="background-color:#000000"|
|colspan=2 |against all
|
|9.22%
|-
| colspan="5" style="background-color:#E9E9E9;"|
|- style="font-weight:bold"
| colspan="3" style="text-align:left;" | Total
| 
| 100%
|-
| colspan="5" style="background-color:#E9E9E9;"|
|- style="font-weight:bold"
| colspan="4" |Source:
|
|}

2016

|-
! colspan=2 style="background-color:#E9E9E9;text-align:left;vertical-align:top;" |Candidate
! style="background-color:#E9E9E9;text-align:leftt;vertical-align:top;" |Party
! style="background-color:#E9E9E9;text-align:right;" |Votes
! style="background-color:#E9E9E9;text-align:right;" |%
|-
|style="background-color:"|
|align=left|Daniil Bessarabov
|align=left|United Russia
|
|36.58%
|-
|style="background-color:"|
|align=left|Andrey Sartakov
|align=left|Communist Party
|
|15.99%
|-
|style="background-color:"|
|align=left|Andrey Shchukin
|align=left|Liberal Democratic Party
|
|13.77%
|-
|style="background:"| 
|align=left|Aleksandr Molotov
|align=left|A Just Russia
|
|13.37%
|-
|style="background:"| 
|align=left|Vladimir Ryzhkov
|align=left|Yabloko
|
|11.63%
|-
|style="background:"| 
|align=left|Tatyana Reznikova
|align=left|Civic Platform
|
|2.95%
|-
|style="background:"| 
|align=left|Pavel Chesnov
|align=left|Party of Growth
|
|1.58%
|-
| colspan="5" style="background-color:#E9E9E9;"|
|- style="font-weight:bold"
| colspan="3" style="text-align:left;" | Total
| 
| 100%
|-
| colspan="5" style="background-color:#E9E9E9;"|
|- style="font-weight:bold"
| colspan="4" |Source:
|
|}

2021

|-
! colspan=2 style="background-color:#E9E9E9;text-align:left;vertical-align:top;" |Candidate
! style="background-color:#E9E9E9;text-align:left;vertical-align:top;" |Party
! style="background-color:#E9E9E9;text-align:right;" |Votes
! style="background-color:#E9E9E9;text-align:right;" |%
|-
|style="background-color:"|
|align=left|Daniil Bessarabov (incumbent)
|align=left|United Russia
|
|36.56%
|-
|style="background-color:"|
|align=left|Andrey Krivov
|align=left|Communist Party
|
|19.51%
|-
|style="background-color:"|
|align=left|Vitaly Zyryanov
|align=left|Communists of Russia
|
|10.79%
|-
|style="background-color: " |
|align=left|Aleksandr Molotov
|align=left|A Just Russia — For Truth
|
|10.41%
|-
|style="background-color:"|
|align=left|Nadezhda Zyablitseva
|align=left|New People
|
|7.21%
|-
|style="background-color:"|
|align=left|Valentin Borozdin
|align=left|Party of Pensioners
|
|6.37%
|-
|style="background-color:"|
|align=left|Aleksey Skosyrsky
|align=left|Liberal Democratic Party
|
|4.67%
|-
| colspan="5" style="background-color:#E9E9E9;"|
|- style="font-weight:bold"
| colspan="3" style="text-align:left;" | Total
| 
| 100%
|-
| colspan="5" style="background-color:#E9E9E9;"|
|- style="font-weight:bold"
| colspan="4" |Source:
|
|}

Notes

References

Russian legislative constituencies
Politics of Altai Krai